The Russian sturgeon (Acipenser gueldenstaedtii), also known as the diamond sturgeon or Danube sturgeon, is a species of fish in the family Acipenseridae. It is found in Azerbaijan, Bulgaria, Georgia, Iran, Kazakhstan, Romania, Russia, Turkey, Turkmenistan, and Ukraine. It is also found in the Caspian Sea. Russian sturgeon mature and reproduce slowly, making them highly vulnerable to fishing. It is distinguished from other Acipenser species by its short snout with a rounded tip as well as its lower lip which is interrupted at its center.

Description

It has a relatively short and rounded snout with three pairs of unfringed barbels closer to the tip of the snout that to the mouth. The dorsal fin has 27 to 48 soft rays and the anal fin has 16 to 35. The number of scales along the lateral line varies from 21 to 50. This fish can be distinguish from the otherwise similar starry sturgeon by the shape of its snout, its barbels and scale arrangement. The upper surface is greyish-green, the lateral scales are pale and the belly white.

Distribution and habitat
The Russian sturgeon is native to the Black Sea, the Sea of Azov and the Caspian Sea. It is an anadromous fish and moves into the river systems that drain into these seas in order to make its way to spawning areas upstream. It is usually found near the bottom in fairly shallow water over sandy or muddy substrates.

Biology
The Russian sturgeon feeds on crustaceans, molluscs and small fishes such as gobies, anchovies and sprats. It is solitary when in the sea but becomes gregarious as it moves up-river in April, May and June to spawn.

Hybrid
In a paper published in July 2020, eggs from three Russian sturgeons were crossbred with American paddlefish using sperm from four male paddlefishes, resulting in successful hybrids called sturddlefish. The resulting offspring had a survival rate of 62% to 74% and on average reached  after a year of growth. This is the first time such fish from different genera and families successfully were crossbred.

See also

Beluga (which lives in the same area, being famous for its roe – caviar)

Sources

Acipenser
Fish of the Caspian Sea
Freshwater fish of Europe
Freshwater fish of Asia
Marine fish of Asia
Marine fish of Europe
Commercial fish
Critically endangered fish
Critically endangered fauna of Asia
Critically endangered biota of Europe
Taxa named by Johann Friedrich von Brandt
Taxa named by Julius Theodor Christian Ratzeburg
Taxonomy articles created by Polbot
Fish described in 1833